The Northland Steamship Company was a small steamship line that sailed between ports on Puget Sound and Alaska.

In 1914, Northland Steamship was sailing two passenger ships totaling  from the Puget Sound Terminal in Seattle on the Southeast Alaskan Route, regularly visiting the ports of Ketchikan, Wrangell, Petersburg, Douglas, Juneau, Haines, Skagway and Seward in Alaska.

References 

Companies based in Seattle
Shipping companies of the United States